Gateway West Building was a skyscraper in Century City, Los Angeles, California.

Location
The Gateway West Building is located on the southwest corner of Santa Monica Boulevard and the Avenue of the Stars in Century City, a district in the city of Los Angeles.

History
Completed in 1963, Gateway West was the first building erected in Century City—an architectural plan that converted the back lot of 20th Century Fox into a modern neighbourhood with skyscrapers.

Gateway West's twin-sister building, Gateway East, was located directly across from it on Avenue of the Stars.  Gateway East, was the second high-rise building completed in the new redevelopment. Gateway West was demolished in 2015 to make way for an expansion of Westfield Century City.

Heritage significance
As the first high-rise building erected in Century City, this building represented the new style of the neighbourhood.

References

Century City, Los Angeles
Skyscraper office buildings in Los Angeles
1963 establishments in California
2015 disestablishments in California
Office buildings completed in 1963
Buildings and structures demolished in 2015